The Zadole Park which used to be a hamlet of Piotrowice, but now it belongs to Katowice districts of Upper Silesian Metropolitan Union there is a park with an amphitheater for 800 persons, a swimming-pool complex, a cafe and a playground for children and walking alleys. In 1906-1914 it was a place of the convention of the Polish choirs and bands within the framework of the Singing Societies existing in that region at that time. Students Hostels adjoin the center and not far from them there are tennis courts - free of charge.

Parks in Katowice